Rana Shumsher Rana (posthumously known as Rana Shumsher Jung Bahadur Rana; 1861–1887) was the Commander-In-Chief of the Nepalese Army from March 1887 to June 1887.

Rana was born in 1861 in Kathmandu to Dhir Shamsher Rana as a fourth child. He had a reputation of being a drunkard. During the 1885 Nepal coup d'état, he was tasked by Bir Shumsher to keep Dhoj Narsingh Rana distracted by drinking with him in his room, while other would assassinate Ranodip Singh Kunwar.  

Rana rose to power after Khadga Shumsher Jung Bahadur Rana was removed from the rolls of succession and Rana died in office after serving as the commander-in-chief for three months. He was succeeded by his brother Dev Shumsher Jung Bahadur Rana.

He died in June 1887.

References 

1861 births
1887 deaths
19th-century Nepalese nobility
Nepalese generals
People from Kathmandu
Rana dynasty